Primrose is an unincorporated community in Meriwether County, in the U.S. state of Georgia.

History
The community most likely was named after the primrose flower. A post office called Primrose was established in 1907, and remained in operation until 1931.

The Georgia General Assembly incorporated Primrose as a town in 1908. The town's municipal charter was repealed in 1995.

References

Former municipalities in Georgia (U.S. state)
Unincorporated communities in Meriwether County, Georgia
Unincorporated communities in Georgia (U.S. state)
Populated places disestablished in 1995